Flight Lieutenant Geoffrey "Sammy" Allard  & Bar (12 August 1912 – 13 March 1941) was a Royal Air Force (RAF) flying ace of the Second World War. Allard scored 19 victories against enemy aircraft, as well as five shared kills and two probable kills, during the war.

Early life
Allard was born in Strensall, Yorkshire, on 12 August 1912, the son of Sydney Harold Allard and Elizabeth Allard (née Higgins). He joined the RAF in 1929, and served an apprenticeship at RAF Halton, qualifying as a leading aircraftman mechanic. He applied for pilot training in 1936 and became a sergeant pilot with No. 87 Squadron RAF in 1937.

He married Kathleen Minnie Ross in York in 1937. In June 1938 he joined No. 85 Squadron RAF.

Second World War
Flying the Hawker Hurricane, Allard saw action in the Battle of France, scoring around 8 kills.

He was made a flight sergeant on 17 August 1940 (with seniority from 15 August). Also in August he was commissioned and became an acting flight lieutenant commanding 'A' flight.

Eight more kills were scored in the Battle of Britain between 24 August 1940 and 1 September 1940. Allard was selected by Fighter Command to have his portrait drawn by Cuthbert Orde, sitting for it on the same day that he was awarded a second Distinguished Flying Medal, 13 September 1940.

In October the Squadron was withdrawn to become a night-fighter unit. He was awarded a Distinguished Flying Cross (DFC) the same month.

On 6 December 1940, Allard was promoted from pilot officer to flying officer.

On 13 March 1941, Allard was scheduled to take the newly promoted Pilot Officer Francis "Frank" Walker-Smith to RAF Ford to collect a version of the twin-engined Douglas Boston (known to the RAF as the Douglas Havoc and used primarily for night-fighting duties). At the last moment New Zealand ace Pilot Officer William Hodgson (who was reputed to have a girlfriend at RAF Ford) hitched a lift. A loose gun inspection panel became dislodged and flew back jamming the rudder. This caused the aircraft to crash at Tye Green near Wimbish, killing all three occupants close to RAF Debden.

Allard and Walker-Smith had seen action together as part of the British Expeditionary Force (based at Lille/Seclin, France) in early 1940 and all three had success as Battle of Britain pilots.

Allard is buried alongside Hodgson and Walker-Smith at the Saffron Walden Cemetery.

Honours and awards
13 September 1940 – 563859 Sergeant Geoffrey Allard DFM is awarded a bar to the Distinguished Flying Medal.

8 October 1940 – The Distinguished Flying Cross is awarded to Pilot Officer Geoffrey Allard, DFM, (44551) — Between 30 August and 1 September 1940, this officer destroyed seven enemy aircraft; previously he had destroyed ten and shared in the destruction of others. He has displayed outstanding skill and courage in combat against the enemy.

On 12 March 2011, a 70th anniversary commemorative event was staged at Carver Barracks – the old RAF Debden near Saffron Walden – which is 85 Squadron's World War II spiritual home. Relatives and friends of the three men who died on 13 March 1941 met at the Officers' Mess. The event included a display by a Supermarine Spitfire from the Historical Aircraft Collection (a last-minute substitute for the planned Hawker Hurricane flypast) and a Memorial Service held in Wimbish Church, the parish church for RAF Debden. On 13 March 2011, there was a ceremonial laying of wreaths on the graves of Allard, Hodgson and Walker-Smith in Radwinter Road Cemetery, Saffron Walden, and the official naming of a road in the town called "Allard Way". Allard Crescent in Bushey is named in his honour, one of a number of streets in the area named after Battle of Britain pilots.

References

Notes

Bibliography

External links

1912 births
1941 deaths
Burials in Essex
British World War II flying aces
Royal Air Force personnel killed in World War II
Royal Air Force officers
Royal Air Force pilots of World War II
English aviators
Recipients of the Distinguished Flying Cross (United Kingdom)
Recipients of the Distinguished Flying Medal
The Few
Aviators killed in aviation accidents or incidents in England
People from York
Military personnel from Yorkshire